Abdullah Ramadan Suliman (born 11 November 1966) is a Sudanese boxer. He competed in the men's light middleweight event at the 1988 Summer Olympics.

References

External links
 

1966 births
Living people
Sudanese male boxers
Olympic boxers of Sudan
Boxers at the 1988 Summer Olympics
Place of birth missing (living people)
Light-middleweight boxers